San Cataldo may refer to:

Places in Italy
Chiesa di San Cataldo, a church in the City of Palermo, Sicily
, in the Province of Lecce
San Cataldo di Lecce, Apulia
San Cataldo, Sicily, a commune in the Province of Caltanissetta

People
Catald, Irish saint, Bishop of Taranto, Italian name San Cataldo